The Thomas Stone National Historic Site, also known as Haberdeventure or the Thomas Stone House, is a United States National Historic Site located about  south of Washington D.C. in Charles County, Maryland. The site was established to protect the home and property of Founding Father Thomas Stone, one of the 56 signers of the United States Declaration of Independence. His home and estate were owned by the Stone family until 1936.

History
Stone purchased Haberdeventure in 1770 and began construction of a new home in 1771. Stone's original plan was to build a small, modest home for him, his wife Margaret, and their two daughters but before the house was completed, his father died and five of his younger brothers and sisters came to live with him at Haberdeventure creating the need for larger living quarters. During the 1780s, the Haberdeventure plantation probably supported about 25 to 35 people, including a number of slaves. Stone was buried in the family cemetery adjacent to his home.

Descendants of Thomas Stone continued to own Haberdeventure until 1936 when the land was sold.

The house was declared a National Historic Landmark in 1971.

The property was privately owned until 1977 when a fire severely damaged the central section of the house. Haberdeventure was authorized as a National Historic Site a year later in 1978 and was purchased by the National Park Service in 1981. Restoration efforts on the historic structures began at this time but the house was not opened to the public until 1997.

Today, a visitor center located at the site has exhibits on the Declaration of Independence and the life of Thomas Stone. Guided tours of Haberdeventure are also offered.  In 2008, the Thomas Stone National Historic Site ranked 344th among 360 sites where the National Park Service tracks attendance with 5,720 visitors.

Gallery

See also
List of National Historic Landmarks in Maryland
National Register of Historic Places listings in Charles County, Maryland

References

External links
National Park Service: Thomas Stone National Historic Site
, including undated photo, at Maryland Historical Trust

National Historic Sites in Maryland
Maryland in the American Revolution
National Historic Landmarks in Maryland
Houses on the National Register of Historic Places in Maryland
African-American history of Maryland
History of slavery in Maryland
Historic house museums in Maryland
Museums in Charles County, Maryland
Houses completed in 1771
Plantations in Maryland
Protected areas established in 1978
Houses in Charles County, Maryland
Historic American Buildings Survey in Maryland
Stone family residences
National Register of Historic Places in Charles County, Maryland
Jenifer family
Homes of United States Founding Fathers